Digital Druglord (stylized in all lowercase) is the third studio album by American singer blackbear. It was released on April 21, 2017, by Beartrap, Alamo Records, and Interscope Records, his first album under a major record label, follows after the release of his independent albums, Deadroses and Help (both released in 2015), as well as his EP, Salt which was released two weeks prior.

The album include guest appearances from Gucci Mane, Juicy J, Stalking Gia and 24hrs. It was preceded by one single; "Do Re Mi".

Singles
The album's lead single, "Do Re Mi" was released on March 17, 2017. It reached number 40 on the Billboard Hot 100.

"If I Could I Would Feel Nothing" and "Make Daddy Proud" were released as promotion singles on December 2, 2016 and January 29, 2017, respectively.

Commercial performance
The album debuted at number fourteen on the US Billboard 200 with 29,000 album-equivalent units in its first week. The album was certified gold by the Recording Industry Association of America (RIAA) for combined sales and album-equivalent units of over 500,000 copies in the United States.

Track listing
Credits were adapted from iTunes and Tidal.

Notes
  signifies a co-producer
 Every song is stylized in lowercase letters. For example, "Do Re Mi" is stylized as "do re mi".

Personnel
Credits were adapted from Tidal.

Performers
 Blackbear – primary artist
 24hrs – featured artist 
 Stalking Gia – featured artist 
 Juicy J – featured artist 

Production
 Blackbear – producer 
 Neenyo – producer 
 FWDSLXSH – producer 
 Tarro – producer 
 Nicholas Pelletier – producer 
 Andrew Goldstein – producer 
 Rad Cat – producer 
 Ayo – producer 
 EY – producer 
 Bizness Boi – producer 
 Prep Bijan – producer 
 Th3ory – producer 
 J. Hill – producer 
 Jeremy Zucker – producer

Charts

Weekly charts

Year-end charts

Certifications

References

2017 albums
Blackbear (musician) albums
Interscope Records albums